The "Transit of Venus March" is a march scored for military brass band written by John Philip Sousa in 1883 to celebrate the 1882 Transit of Venus and published by the J.W. Pepper Company.  The work was erroneously thought to be lost for over 100 years when a piano transcription published in 1896 was found by a Library of Congress employee in 2003. Copies of the original Pepper publication, however, do survive.

Background 
One year after the 1882 Transit of Venus, Sousa was commissioned to compose a processional for the unveiling of a bronze statue of American physicist Joseph Henry, who had died in 1878.  Henry, who had developed the first electric motor, was also the first secretary of the Smithsonian Institution in Washington, D.C.

A Freemason, Sousa was fascinated by what the group considered mystical qualities in otherwise natural phenomena.  According to Sten Odenwald of the NASA IMAGE Science Center, this played a significant role in the selection of the time and date of the performance, April 19, 1883, at 4:00 P.M.  Dr. Odenwald points out that Venus and Mars, invisible to the participants, were setting in the west. At the same time, the moon, Uranus, and Virgo were rising in the east, Saturn had crossed the meridian, and Jupiter was directly overhead.  According to Masonic lore, Venus was associated with the element copper, a component of electric motors.

2003 resurrection 
The "Transit of Venus March" never caught on during Sousa's lifetime. It went unplayed for many years, after Sousa's manuscript copies of the music were destroyed in a flood.  As reported in The Washington Post, Library of Congress employee Loris J. Schissel found copies of the old sheet music for the "Transit of Venus March" "languishing in the library's files". The piece was resurrected in time for the 2004 Transit of Venus.  The piece had been performed on compilation albums before then, but it was the 2004 transit that brought it to wide public attention.

The Library of Congress joined with NASA to celebrate the 2004 transit with this march.

Gallery

People

Transits of Venus

See also 
 List of marches by John Philip Sousa

Notes

References

External links 

Copies of the original march (including all player parts) published by JW Pepper in 1883
Audio recording of the march (performed 2003 by the Virginia Grand Military Band)
Video recording of the 2004 transit of venus, accompanied by the Sousa march, produced by John Walker

Sousa marches
1883 compositions
Transit of Venus